Peter Haring (born 2 June 1993) is an Austrian footballer who plays as a midfielder for Scottish Premiership club Heart of Midlothian.

Career

Austria 
Throughout his career in Austria, Haring played for many lower division sides, including SK Rapid Wien II, SC Austria Lustenau and SV Ried. After failing to win promotion to the top division in the 2017–18 season, Haring left Ried on a free transfer.

Heart of Midlothian 
Haring signed a two-year contract for Hearts in June 2018; originally touted as a defender, he established himself in the team as an influential midfielder.

After impressing in the 2018–19 season, Haring signed a contract extension keeping him at the club until 2022. By then he was suffering from a pelvic injury, which was aggravated during the 2019 Scottish Cup Final (a defeat by Celtic) and subsequently caused him to miss all of the curtailed 2019–20 season – as a result of which ended with the club being contentiously relegated from the Scottish Premiership. He began to appear more frequently again during 2020–21, in which there was more disappointment as Hearts lost the delayed 2020 Scottish Cup Final to Celtic at an empty Hampden Park, this time on penalties (Haring appeared as a substitute); however, they won the Scottish Championship and regained their top tier place.

Career Statistics

Notes

References

External links
 
 
Peter Haring at Soccerbase

1993 births
Living people
Austrian footballers
SC Austria Lustenau players
Association football defenders
SV Ried players
2. Liga (Austria) players
Austrian expatriate footballers
Expatriate footballers in Scotland
Heart of Midlothian F.C. players
Scottish Professional Football League players
Austrian expatriate sportspeople in Scotland
Footballers from Burgenland
People from Eisenstadt